Hannah Crocker (June 27, 1752July 11, 1829) was an American essayist and one of the first advocates of women's rights in America, as well as a pioneer for women's participation in Freemasonry. Her Observations on the Real Rights of Women (1818) was the first book on the rights of women by an American.

Life and family
Hannah Mather born in Roxbury, Massachusetts, on June 27, 1752. She was the daughter of Samuel Mather, a Congregationalist minister, and Hannah Hutchinson. She was a descendant of the Mather dynasty founded in New England by Richard Mather (1596–1669), through his son Increase Mather (1639–1723) and his grandson Cotton Mather (1663-1728), all prominent Puritan ministers involved in the important religious and political issues of their era, including the Salem Witch Trials and the controversy over vaccination against smallpox. Her mother's brother was Thomas Hutchinson, Governor of the Province of Massachusetts Bay in the years preceding the American Revolution. She inherited a portrait of the founder of the Mather dynasty. She was raised in a religious environment and had strong religious beliefs throughout her life. Her father was an educated man who believed in the importance of educating women, which lead to her passion for women's rights. She was extensively educated in languages, history, theology, and literature. 
 
In Reminiscences and Traditions of Boston, she recounted how as a teenager in 1775 she had hidden letters written by her father under her clothing, smuggled them out of British-occupied Boston, and delivered them to Joseph Warren, a leader of the rebel forces.

On 18 March 1779, she married Joseph Crocker, a graduate of Harvard College and a captain in the Revolutionary War. He was also an advocate for women's rights. They had ten children between 1780 and 1795. During her marriage she became involved in Freemasonry and worked to advance women's place in society by founding St. Anne's Lodge, an all-female organization guided by masonic principles to provide women with instruction in literature and science.

She also wrote and became a well-known essayist and poet. Her political affiliation was always with the Federalist Party. In 1812 she founded the School of Industry to provide instruction in vocational skills for "the female children of the poor in the Northern district of Boston". She died in Dorchester, Massachusetts, on July 11, 1829, and was interred in the Mather family tomb in Copp's Hill Burying Ground in Boston's North End.

Writings
In 1787 she authored the North Square Creed. Never published, it is a statement in the style of a pledge taken by a new member of a fraternal organization. It is thought to be designed to allow husbands of women who joined St. Anne's Lodge to commit themselves to certain principles within marriage. The title uses coded language a Mason would recognize.

She published Observations on the Real Rights of Women, with Their Appropriate Duties, Reminiscences and Traditions of Boston, Agreeable to Scripture, Reason and Common Sense in Boston in 1818. She argued that men and women were equal in mental capacity, though allowed for different expressions according to gender. This view formed the basis of her advocacy of female education:

Her views remained in many respects traditional. She wrote, for example, that "It must be women's prerogative to shine in the domestic circle and her appropriate duty to teach and regulate the opening mind of her little flock.... The surest foundation to secure the female's right, must be in family government." She included a defense of Mary Wollstonecraft, whom Boston society viewed as a libertine.

In her chronicle Reminiscences and Traditions of Boston, authored between 1822 and 1829, she both described and analyzed the events of the American Revolution, laying out some of the early groundwork for a political and theoretical understanding of its causes and achievements. It presented an ideological argument that combined political theory with tradition descriptive historical writing, with an appreciation of the significance of popular demonstrations and an egalitarian emphasis. For example, she located the sources for the Boston riots that protested the Stamp Act in the tradition of anti-Catholic parades, their ritual acts of violence and the burning of effigies. She wrote in the voice of a personal witness to provide the reader with a sense of immediacy. The manuscript was discovered among her papers after her death and acquired by the New England Historic Genealogical Society in 1879, which published it in 2011.

Her other works include: A Series of Letters on Free Masonry and The School of Reform; or, Seaman's Safe Pilot to the Cape of Good Hope.

Notes

References

Additional sources
 L.W. Koengeter, “Crocker, Hannah Mather,” in American Women Writers, ed. Taryn Benbow-Pfalzgraf, vol. 1, 2nd ed. (Detroit: St. James Press, 2000), 241.

External links
 Excerpt from Observations on the Real Rights of Women, With Their Appropriate Duties, Agreeable to Scripture, Reason and Common Sense (Boston, 1818)

1752 births
1829 deaths
Writers from Massachusetts
Women in the American Revolution
People from colonial Boston
American spies during the American Revolution
18th-century American women writers
19th-century American women writers
American essayists
Colonial American women
American women essayists
People of Massachusetts in the American Revolution